Tutto can refer to:
Music
Tutto Live, album by Gianna Nannini
Tutto è possibile, debut album studio by Finley
Tutto Tony Tammaro, greatest hits album by Neapolitan parody singer-songwriter Tony Tammaro
Tutto Fabrizio De André, first album released by Fabrizio De André

Film
Tutto l'amore che c'è, 2000 film by Italian director Sergio Rubini 
Tutto il mondo ride, a 1952 Italian film 

Other
Tutto, an Italian brand of paper towels owned by Georgia-Pacific

See also
Tutti
Tutta